Pyrimidone is the name given to either of two heterocyclic compounds with the formula C4H4N2O: 2-pyrimidone and 4-pyrimidone. The compounds can also be called 2-hydroxypyrimidine or 4-hydroxypyrimidine respectively, based on a substituted pyrimidine, or 1,3-diazine, ring.

Derivatives 
Derivatives of pyrimidone are the basis of many other biological molecules, including:
 Nucleobases, such as cytosine
 Barbiturates, such as metharbital

Antiulcer drugs including temelastine, icotidine, donetidine, and lupitidine.